David Sagitovich Belyavskiy (born 23 February 1992) is a Russian artistic gymnast and three-time Olympian, representing Russia in 2012 and 2016 and ROC in 2020.  He was part of the teams who won gold at the 2020 Olympic Games and 2019 World Championships and silver at the 2016 Olympic Games and 2018 World Championships.  Individually Belyavskiy won an Olympic bronze medal on parallel bars in 2016 and a World silver and bronze medal on pommel horse and parallel bars, respectively, in 2017.  Additionally he is the 2019 European Games champion, a five-time European Games medalist, seven-time European champion, and 18-time European medalist.

Personal life 
Belyavskiy was born in Votkinsk, Udmurtia. His parents died early in his life and he was raised by his grandparents, growing up in a boarding school. He attended Ural State University. He married his fiancée, Maria, on October 30, 2016, in Santorini, Greece. In September 2017 their daughter, Alyssia Belyavskaya, was born.

Career 
Belyavskiy competed in his first world championships in 2010, and finished 6th in all-around at the 2011 World Artistic Gymnastics Championships.

2012
In 2012 Belyavskiy became the national champion on parallel bars.

Belyavskiy won the Russian Cup all-around in 2012. He was part of the Russian team that competed at the 2012 Europeans where they won the silver medal behind Great Britain. Belyavskiy then competed at the 2012 Summer Olympics, finishing 5th in the all-around finals and 7th in the pommel horse final. He won bronze in the all-around at the 2012 Stuttgart World Cup.

2013
Belyavskiy began his 2013 season by winning the Russian National all-around title and defending his parallel bars title. Later, he became the 2013 European individual all-around champion with an overall score of  89.799 points edging out British gymnast Max Whitlock for the gold. He won bronze in the parallel bars final with a score of 15.533 and placed 5th on floor with a score of 14.4.

Belyavskiy, alongside the Russian team (Nikolai Kuksenkov, Emin Garibov, Denis Ablyazin and Nikita Ignatyev) won the team gold at the 2013 Summer Universiade in Kazan. He won the all-around bronze medal (tied with Ukrainian gymnast Oleg Verniaiev). At the event finals, he won a bronze medal on floor, and a silver medal on parallel bars behind compatriot Garibov.

Roughly a week before the 2013 World Championships Belyavskiy sustained an ankle injury. He went on to compete at the World Championships however only qualified to the all around final in 14th place, coming 12th in the final with a score of 86.274.

2014
In 2014 Belyavskiy won his 2nd consecutive national all around title and his 3rd consecutive national parallel bars title.

On May 19–25, at the 2014 European Championships in Sofia Belyavskiy contributed scores of 15.466 (floor), 13.200 (pommel horse), 15.166 (vault), 15.266 (parallel bar) and 14.600 (horizontal bar) for Russia and along with teammates (Denis Ablyazin, Aleksandr Balandin, Nikita Ignatyev, Nikolai Kuksenkov) won Russia the team event gold medal with a total score of 267.959, over 2 points ahead of defending champions Great Britain. In event finals, he won silver on parallel bars with a score of 15.566 behind Ukrainian Oleg Verniaiev. He also placed 8th in the floor final with a score of 14.866.

At the World Championships in Nanning, China, Belyavskiy qualified 2nd into the all around final, as well as qualifying to the high bar final and team final. Belyavskiy competed on floor, pommel horse, vault, parallel bars and high bar to help the Russian team of Belyavskiy, Denis Ablyazin, Nikita Ignatyev, Nikolai Kuksenkov, Daniil Kazachkov and Ivan Stretovich to a 5th-place finish in the team final. He also placed 5th in the all around final, scoring 89.765, and 5th in the high bar final, scoring 14.733.

2015
In 2015, Belyavskiy won his third consecutive national all-around title and his fourth consecutive national parallel bars title.

At the 2015 European Championships in Montpellier, France, Belyavskiy had a rough time in the qualifications round, qualifying sixth to the all around final and third to the floor final, but did not make any other finals. In the all-around final, he suffered a fall on pommel horse in the second rotation, but made a comeback to win silver with 88.131 behind Oleg Verniaiev. Belyavskiy also won silver in the floor final behind Briton Kristian Thomas with a score of 15.066.

In June, Belyavskiy competed in the 2015 European Games, winning gold in the team competition. Due to a wrist injury, he did not compete in the all-around, but he qualified for the floor, pommel horse and parallel bars finals. He won the bronze in the floor final with a score of 15.000, placed fourth in the pommel horse final with a score of 13.900, and won the silver in the parallel bars final with a score of 15.700, only 0.033 points behind winner Oleg Stepko.

At the 2015 World Championships in Glasgow, Belyavskiy competed on all events in the team final to help team Russia finish in fourth place. In the all-around final he placed eleventh with a score of 88.031 after a fall on vault.

2016
At the 2016 Russian National Championships Belyavskiy won a gold medal with his team. After the first day he was leading the all around competition with a score of 90.367 however on the second day he suffered multiple falls and mistakes to place 4th score 86.266, giving him a total of 176.633 to win the bronze medal behind Nikolai Kuksenkov and Nikita Nagornyy. He defended his national title on the parallel bars, winning for the 5th consecutive year.

In May, Belyavskiy competed at the 2016 European Championships. In qualifying he competed on every event except rings to help Russia qualify in first place to the team final, as well as qualifying himself to four event finals: floor, pommel horse, parallel bars and high bar. In the team final, Belyavskiy again competed on every event except rings, scoring a 15.166 on floor, a 15.433 on pommel horse, 15.233 on vault, 15.933 on parallel bars and 14.733 on high bar, helping Russia to win team gold with a score of 271.378, nearly 3 points ahead of Great Britain. In event finals he became European champion on parallel bars with a score of 16.033, ahead of 2014 world champion Oleg Verniaiev. He also won bronze on high bar (14.941), silver on pommel horse (15.233) and placed 4th on floor (15.200), making him the most decorated gymnast at the European Championships. He was also awarded the Longines Prize for Elegance.

On August 6–16, Belyavskiy then competed with the Russian team (together with Ivan Stretovich, Denis Ablyazin, Nikolai Kuksenkov and Nikita Nagornyy) at the 2016 Summer Olympics in Rio de Janeiro. The Russian team qualified in 3rd place to the team final, with Belyavskiy also qualifying in 3rd place to the all around, 8th place to the pommel horse final and 2nd place to the parallel bars final.

In the team final he contributed scores of 14.666 on floor, 15.500 on pommel horse, 15.033 on vault, 15.800 on parallel bars and 14.958 on horizontal bar towards the Russian team's silver medal- the first Olympic team medal for Russia since 2000, and the first team medal for Russia since the 2006 World Championships. They won silver with a score of 271.452, 0.331 ahead of China, who were the defending Olympic champions.

In the all around final Belyavskiy finished in 4th place with a score of 90.498, only 0.143 behind bronze medalist Max Whitlock. In the pommel horse final he finished in 5th place with a score of 15.400, and in the parallel bars final he won the bronze medal with a score of 15.783, behind former world champions Oleg Verniaiev and Danell Leyva.

2017 
Belyavskiy was not initially planning to compete in the 2017 Russian National Championships due to kidney stone problems, however he decided to compete anyway. He did not compete in the all around competition, showing routines on every event except rings in the qualification round. Balyavskiy was unable to defend his nation title on parallel bars as he did not qualify for the event final, however he did win his first national titles on pommel horse, with a score of 14.3, and high bar, with a score of 13.8. He also placed 5th in the floor final with a score of 13.5. Belyavskiy was then named to the team for the 2017 European Championships. At these championships, Belavskiy performed well, winning gold on the pommel horse, getting bronze on the horizontal bar, and placing fourth on the parallel bars.

2018
Belyavskiy competed in the 2018 Russian National Championships, winning individual gold on pommel horse, silver on the all-around, still rings and high bar, and bronze on the team event. He also placed fourth on the individual floor exercise event. He also competed at the 2018 European Championships, securing the team bronze medal as part of the Russian squad while capturing individual the silver medal on parallel bars and placing fourth on pommel horse. Lastly, at the 2018 Artistic Gymnastics World Championships in Doha, Qatar, Belyavskiy took the team silver medal as part of the Russian squad, and finished in seventh place on the individual pommel horse event.

2019
In June, Belyavskiy competed at the European Games in Minsk, Belarus. He placed first all-around, eighth on floor exercise, fifth on high bar, fourth on parallel bars, first on pommel horse, and eighth on rings.

In October, Belyavskiy was part of the Russian gold-medal-winning squad who won the all-around team event gold medal at the 2019 Artistic Gymnastics World Championships in Stuttgart, Germany. He also placed eighth in the individual pommel horse event final.

2021 
Belyavskiy competed at the Russian Championships where he finished third in the all-around behind Aleksandr Kartsev and Artur Dalaloyan.  He was selected to compete at the upcoming European Championships. He qualified to the all-around, pommel horse, parallel bars, and horizontal bar event finals.  During the all-around final he finished second behind compatriot Nikita Nagornyy.  During event finals he won gold on horizontal bar, silver on parallel bars behind Ferhat Arıcan, and placed sixth on pommel horse.  Belyavskiy next competed at the Russian Cup where he won gold on pommel horse and parallel bars.  Afterwards he was selected to represent the Russian Olympic Committee at the 2020 Summer Olympics alongside Denis Ablyazin, Dalaloyan, and Nagornyy.

At the 2020 Summer Olympics in Tokyo Belyavskiy helped the team qualify to the team final in third place and individually qualified to the pommel horse and parallel bars event finals; he finished tenth in the all-around qualification but did not advance to the final due to Nagornyy and Dalaloyan placing higher.  During the team final Belyavskiy competed on three events and helped the team finish first with a combined score of 262.500; this was the first team Olympic gold medal for Russian athletes in 25 years.

On 11 September, he along with his Olympic Team were awarded with Order of Friendship by President Vladimir Putin.

Competitive history

See also
List of Olympic male artistic gymnasts for Russia

References

External links

 
 David Belyavskiy at sportgymrus.ru 
 

1992 births
Living people
Russian male artistic gymnasts
Gymnasts at the 2012 Summer Olympics
Gymnasts at the 2016 Summer Olympics
Gymnasts at the 2020 Summer Olympics
Olympic gymnasts of Russia
Gymnasts at the 2015 European Games
European Games medalists in gymnastics
European Games gold medalists for Russia
European Games silver medalists for Russia
European Games bronze medalists for Russia
People from Votkinsk
Olympic gold medalists for the Russian Olympic Committee athletes
Olympic gold medalists for Russia
Olympic silver medalists for Russia
Olympic bronze medalists for Russia
Medalists at the 2016 Summer Olympics
Medalists at the 2020 Summer Olympics
Medalists at the World Artistic Gymnastics Championships
Olympic medalists in gymnastics
Universiade medalists in gymnastics
Ural State University alumni
Universiade gold medalists for Russia
Universiade silver medalists for Russia
Universiade bronze medalists for Russia
Gymnasts at the 2019 European Games
Medalists at the 2013 Summer Universiade
Originators of elements in artistic gymnastics
European champions in gymnastics
Sportspeople from Sverdlovsk Oblast